Sweepers are small, tropical marine (occasionally brackish) perciform fish of the family Pempheridae. Found in the western Atlantic Ocean and Indo-Pacific region, the family contains about 26 species in two genera. One species (Pempheris xanthoptera) is the target of subsistence fisheries in Japan, where the fish is much enjoyed for its taste. Sweepers are occasionally kept in marine aquaria.

Description 
Deeply keeled, compressed bodies and large eyes typify sweepers, their form somewhat like hatchetfish; both cycloid and ctenoid scales may be present. The small, short dorsal fin begins before the body's midpoint and may have four to seven spines; the anal fin is extensive and usually has three spines. The mouth is subterminal and strongly oblique. Species of the genus Parapriacanthus have much more cylindrical bodies.

Some species possess photophores. All but the curved sweeper (Pempheris poeyi) possess a gas bladder. Colouration is relatively subdued.

Behaviour 

Characteristically shallow water, schooling fish (especially as juveniles), sweepers are nocturnal and seek shelter under ledges or in the caves, nooks, and crannies of reefs or eroded, rocky shorelines during the day. They are often found sharing these hiding places with cardinalfishes and bigeyes, also nocturnal species. At night, sweepers forage for zooplankton, their primary food.

At least one species, the small-scale bullseye (Pempheris compressa) of Australia, is known to enter coastal estuaries whilst young.

Genera
The following genera are classified within the family Pempheridae:

 Parapriacanthus Steindachner, 1870
 Pempheris Cuvier, 1829

Timeline

References

 
Percoidea